Presidential elections were held in Poland on 20 June 2010. As no candidate received a majority of votes in the first round, a second round was held on 4 July 2010. Bronisław Komorowski, the acting President of Poland and vice-chairman of the Civic Platform, defeated Jarosław Kaczyński, twin brother of recently deceased President Lech Kaczyński and chairman of Law and Justice. The global financial crisis, flooding in Poland and the Smolensk disaster were the main themes in the last months of the election campaign.

Background
The 2010 presidential election was expected to be a rematch of the 2005 election between Lech Kaczyński and Donald Tusk. Since the last presidential election, Polish politics had become centered around the rivalry between Law and Justice and the Civic Platform. President Kaczyński and Prime Minister Tusk were constantly battling each other over who should represent Poland on the international stage. Tusk was leading Kaczyński in all the opinion polling (as he did in 2005 before he ultimately lost) and the election was expected to be a dirty one. However, this rematch never came to be. Donald Tusk announced in January 2010 that he will not run for President because he wants to remain Prime Minister. Lech Kaczyński was set to declare his candidacy for re-election on 23 May but he died on 10 April in the Smolensk air disaster.

After Donald Tusk declined to run for president, the Civic Platform organized a presidential primary. The primary was won by Bronisław Komorowski who defeated Radosław Sikorski receiving 68.5% of the vote to Sikorski's 31.5%. Bronisław Komorowski consistently lead Lech Kaczyński by double digits in the first round and by a 2-to-1 margin in the second round. No other candidate registered support in the double digits.

After President Lech Kaczyński's death in a plane crash on 10 April 2010, the Constitution required the Marshal of the Sejm to declare the date within two weeks, with the election to take place on a weekend within the following 60 days, i.e. 20 June at the latest. On 21 April, the Marshal, Bronisław Komorowski, announced the election date as 20 June 2010. Candidates were required to register by 26 April 2010 (with 1,000 signatures of voters in support) and submit 100,000 signatures by 6 May 2010.

Originally, Kaczyński was up for re-election between 19 September and 3 October; the exact date would have been announced between 23 May and 23 June, before the end of his first five-year term of office.

Two candidates for the election died in the crash. Incumbent Lech Kaczyński was nominated as the Law and Justice party candidate (he had yet to accept the nomination, but it was widely believed that he would do so), and Jerzy Szmajdziński was to have run for the Democratic Left Alliance. Jarosław Kaczyński ran for president as the replacement for his deceased twin brother. Jerzy Szmajdziński's replacement was Grzegorz Napieralski.

Senate by-elections to fill the three seats whose senators died in the crash – Krystyna Bochenek (PO), Janina Fetlińska (PiS) and Stanisław Zając (PiS, himself elected in a by-election on 22 June 2008 to replace Andrzej Mazurkiewicz) – were held on the same day.

Candidates 
In total, 23 candidates registered with the Polish National Electoral Commission on, or just following, the 26 April deadline. 17 of the 23 candidacies were accepted by the commission, whilst the remaining 6 were rejected because they had not gathered the required 1000 signatures.

Only ten candidates collected the required 100,000 signatures and were eligible to run for president.

Rejected candidates 
Zdzisław Jankowski
Gabriel Janowski – national-conservative, former Minister of Agriculture
Dariusz Kosiur
Bartłomiej Kurzeja – artist, self-described as "the National Sculptor"
Krzysztof Mazurski – scientist, geographer
Paweł Pietrzyk
Roman Sklepowicz
Paweł Soroka – political scientist
Bogdan Szpryngiel – a former Libertas candidate to the European Parliament
Ludwik Wasiak
Józef Wójcik
Waldemar Urbanowski

Withdrawn 
Ludwik Dorn – former Marshal of Sejm (Law and Justice), candidate of liberal-conservative party Poland Plus.
Tomasz Nałęcz – former Vice-Marshal of Sejm, candidate of Social Democracy of Poland (SdPl).  
Zdzisław Podkański – former member of the European Parliament (Polish People's Party), leader of the national-conservative party Piast.

Dead 
Lech Kaczyński – President who applied to start for reelection. First candidate of Law and Justice. 
Jerzy Szmajdziński – former Minister of Defence, Vice-Marshal of Sejm. First candidate of Democratic Left Alliance.

Campaign  
Bronisław Komorowski's campaign slogan was "Unity builds" (Zgoda buduje) and his strategy was to portray himself as an independent politician ready to work with everyone to fix the nation's problems. He pledged to work closely with the government of Prime Minister Donald Tusk to adopt the euro in about five years, end the unpopular military mission in Afghanistan and promote pro-market reforms.

Jarosław Kaczyński's campaign slogan was "Poland is the most important" (Polska jest najważniejsza) and he aimed to soften his own image and present himself as someone ready for compromise. He praised his late twin brother's legacy and promised to continue his policies as President. He made it a priority to fight crime and corruption, scale back market reforms to preserve a strong welfare state and promote Roman Catholic values

Opinion polls

First round

Second Round

Results 

There were 10 candidates in the first round of voting. Bronisław Komorowski of Civic Platform received 41.5% and Jarosław Kaczyński of Law and Justice received 36.5%, causing a second round of voting between the two. The other eight candidates were eliminated.

Soon after exit polls were released in the second round, Jarosław Kaczyński conceded that he had been defeated. Bronisław Komorowski appeared to tentatively claim victory, stating: "Tonight we will open a small bottle of champagne and tomorrow we will open a big bottle." The exit polls put Komorowski ahead of Kaczyński by 53% to 47%. On the following day, Komorowski was declared the winner of the election. The final result put Komorowski with 53.01% of the vote, and Kaczyński with 46.99%.
Komorowski's win resulted in Civic Platform holding both the Presidency and the government (under Prime Minister Donald Tusk). Correspondents in US and British business newspapers suggested that Komorowski's win would mean closer engagement with the European Union, and such domestic economic reforms as deficit reduction.

References

External links 
The official election site of the Polish Election Committee 

 
Presidential elections in Poland
2010 elections in Poland
Poland
June 2010 events in Europe
July 2010 events in Europe